Bogusław may refer to:

Bogusław (given name)
 Bogusław, West Pomeranian Voivodeship
 Bogusław, Lublin Voivodeship

See also
Bogusławski (disambiguation)
 Bohuslav, a city in Kyiv Oblast, Ukraine, known among Russophones as Boguslav